Superia is an adventure game based on Adventure Rock and  Ketnetkick launched January 2009 by NRK. In the game players could meet KIM, a multifunctional droide-friend, who guided them through the game. The game was shut down on 15 April 2011.

Superia has since the autumn 2009 also been seen on NRK's TV channel for children, NRK Super as a weekend game tips and entertainment for children in the age of 6–12 years. The presenter is Stian Presthus.

References

External links
 Official website

Adventure games